Huoshan Huangya tea (pronounced ) is a yellow tea from Huoshan County of Anhui Province in China. It is an imperial tribute tea, that dates back to the Ming Dynasty. The dry tea leaves have a shiny appearance and are very similar to Huang Shan Mao Feng tea. This tea is usually harvested in early April, and only includes cuttings with one bud and one leaf, or one bud with two unopened leaves. When steeped, the tea has a very sweet and nutty taste as well as an unusual green-yellow color. As with most bud teas, the color and fragrance are slight.

References

 The Harney & Sons Guide to Tea .

Yellow tea
Chinese teas
Chinese tea grown in Anhui